Hedonism concerns any philosophy or value system which considers the pursuit of pleasure to be of great importance

Hedonism may refer to:

Psychological hedonism, the view that the ultimate motive for all voluntary human action is the desire to experience pleasure or to avoid pain
Christian hedonism, a controversial Christian doctrine
The paradox of hedonism, the idea that pleasure does not obey normal principles
 Hedonic psychology, also known as happiness economics
Hedonism Resorts, vacation resorts in Jamaica
Hedonism (single), a single by Skunk Anansie
Hedonism (album), an album by Bellowhead
"Hedonism (Just Because You Feel Good)", a song by Skunk Anansie
Hedonismbot, a minor character in Futurama
Hedonic regression, a method of estimating demand or value

See also
Egoism